This is a list of public art on permanent public display in Cork city, Ireland. The list applies only to works of public art accessible in a public space; it does not include artwork on display inside museums. Public art may include sculptures, statues, monuments, memorials, murals and mosaics.

Public art in city centre

Southside
This is defined as the area of the city south of the south channel of the River Lee, and inside the South Ring Road (N40).

Northside
This is defined as the area of the city north of the north channel of the River Lee.

Fitzgerald's Park

University College Cork

Past public art

See also

List of public art in Belfast
List of public art in Dublin
List of public art in Galway city
List of public art in Limerick

References

Monuments and memorials in the Republic of Ireland
Outdoor sculptures in Ireland
Culture in Cork (city)
Buildings and structures in Cork (city)
Cork
Public art